Back Page is an American 1933 drama film directed by Anton Lorenze and starring Peggy Shannon, Russell Hopton and Claude Gillingwater.

Plot
A former big city reporter becomes the editor of a small town newspaper.

Cast
Peggy Shannon as Jerry Hampton
Russell Hopton as Brice Regal
Claude Gillingwater as Sam Webster
Edwin Maxwell as Martin Regal
Sterling Holloway as Bill Giddings
Rockliffe Fellowes as John Levings
Richard Tucker as John H. Smith
Bryant Washburn as Barman

References

External links
 

1933 films
American drama films
Films about journalists